Scott Devours (born December 15, 1966) is an American drummer and songwriter based in New York City. Devours has played drums for the post-grunge bands Oleander, IMA Robot and Long Beach bands like Speaker and Shave, worked on over thirty albums and toured with a number of well-known artists, including The Who.

Biography

Scott Devours was born December 15, 1966, the son of Hurshel and Joyce Devours and a 3rd great nephew of opera singer Adelina Patti. He graduated from Middletown High School, Middletown, Maryland, in 1985, and lives in New York.  He started drumming as a child and began a professional touring career as soon as he graduated from high school.

Music career

In the late nineties Devours was tapped to play drums for Oleander, a post-grunge band from Sacramento, California. The band quickly became successful, and after opening for Sugar Ray, was approached and signed with Universal. After Devours joined Oleander, the line up was considered stronger, and released albums that reached gold status and provided a Top 40 hit. They released their major label debut February Son which reached gold status in 1999, and their song "Why I'm Here" was featured in the TV series Dawson's Creek.  The band released their second official album Unwind in 2001 and the track "Champion" reached the Top 40. In 2002, Oleander moved to the Sanctuary label, and in March 2003, the band released their third major label album, Joyride which failed to reach the success of their earlier work.

In November 2003, Devours left Oleander to work with the band IMA Robot, an Indie/Punk/Dance band based in Los Angeles that formed in the late nineties. On September 12, 2006, IMA Robot released their second album Monument with Devours on drums which featured the singles "Creeps Me Out" and "Lovers in Captivity".  In 2007 the band left Virgin Records and continued work as an unsigned band under the management of Echo Park Records.

Scott Devours has recorded, performed, and toured with a number of well-known artists, including Roger Daltrey, IMA Robot, Oleander, Honey Honey, speaker, TVM, Sheldon Tarsha, Scott Ambush, Rocco Deluca, Wonderlove, Carbon Leaf, and CPO.  He also toured as an opening act for the White Stripes, 311, Jane's Addiction, Junior Senior, Duran Duran, Fishbone, Beastie Boys, Stone Temple Pilots, Fuel, Three Doors Down, Creed, Hoobastank, Live, Candlebox, The Wailers and The Von Bondies.

Devours' discography includes over thirty major label and independent releases and two gold records. He worked with producers including Andy Wallace and Bob Rock.

In 2009, Devours toured with The Who's Roger Daltrey on the "Use It Or Lose It Tour." The same band, Daltrey's No Plan B, also joined the Eric Clapton tour for several dates in 2010 and played The Who's Tommy at the Royal Albert Hall on March 24, 2011 as part of the Teenage Cancer Trust benefit concerts. Later in the year, the band presented Tommy on a tour of the UK, the US and Canada. Additional dates in Europe, Australia and Japan were scheduled for 2012.  On February 5, 2013, Who touring drummer Zak Starkey was unable to play due to a tendon problem, and Devours filled in for the complete "Quadrophenia and More" concert in San Diego, CA. Devours would go on to replace Starkey on other dates in February 2013, and would again substitute for Starkey during the band's June–July European tour.

Influences

Devours lists a number of drummers as influences, including Buddy Rich, Clem Burke, Phil Collins, Stewart Copeland, Andrew Parker, Bill Ward, Neil Peart, Justin Meldal-Johnsen, Keith Moon and John Bonham.

He lists songwriting influences as The Beatles, Radiohead, Beck, Jeff Buckley, Yes, XTC, Utopia, Stevie Wonder, The Smiths, The Shins, Seals & Crofts, Queen, Mutemath, The Pretenders, Peter Gabriel, No Means No, Elvis Costello, Black Sabbath, Bob Marley, Bob Dylan and the Beastie Boys.

References

External links
Scott Devours MySpace page
IMA Robot MySpace page
The Who Official Website

Living people
1966 births
Musicians from Long Beach, California
Songwriters from California
No Plan B (band) members
People from Middletown, Maryland
20th-century American drummers
American male drummers
20th-century American male musicians
American male songwriters